Zhou Lin may refer to:

Zhou Lin (footballer) (born 1981), Chinese football defender
Zhou Lin (politician) (1912–1997), Chinese politician
Zhou Lin (Tang dynasty) (died 850), Chinese general